Nelly Leon-Chisen, RHIA is the director of coding and classification at the American Hospital Association (AHA), where she is responsible for the direction and overall management of the ANA Central Office on ICD-10-CM and ICD-10-PCS, which is the official United States clearinghouse on coding, sequencing, and reporting data items. She serves as the executive editor of the AHA's coding clinic publications, including the AHA Coding Clinic for ICD-10-CM and ICD-10-PCS and AHA Coding Clinic for HCPCS. She also authors the ICD-10-CM and ICD-10-PCS Coding Handbook with Answers and the ICD-10-CM and ICD-10-PCS Coding Handbook without Answers. (Each handbook publishes annually.) Leon-Chisen represents the AHA as one of the ICD Cooperating Parties involved in the development of the ICD-10-CM and ICD-10-PCS Official Guidelines for Coding and Reporting. She also serves as a staff member to the AHA physician representative to the CPT Editorial Panel and is on the CPT Assistant's Editorial Board.

Activities

Leon-Chisen's participates in a multitude of professional activities, which include the Hospital Outpatient Payment Panel (formerly called the APC Advisory Panel), HEDIS Coding User Panel, National Quality Forum Coding Expert Panel, Outpatient Medicare Technical Advisory Group, and ICD-10 Coordination and Maintenance Committee. She also has represented AHA members by serving on the CPT-5 Project Advisory Group, ICD-10-PCS Technical Advisory Group, and HCFA's Ambulance Fee Schedule Negotiated Rulemaking, Medical Necessity Workgroup.

Other membership activities include serving on the ICD-10-PCS Technical Advisory Panel, past co-chair of the Workgroup for Electronic Data Interchange (WEDI) ICD-10 Implementation Workgroup, and numerous testimonies on ICD-10-CM and ICD-10-PCS before the ICD-9-CM and ICD-10 Coordination and Maintenance Committees and the National Committee on Vital and Health Statistics. Leon-Chisen was also the AHA lead project manager on the joint American Hospital Association (AHA)/American Health Information Management Association (AHIMA) ICD-10-CM Field Study. She is a first-generation AHIMA-approved ICD-10-CM/PCS Trainer.

Leon-Chisen also represented the AHA as a member of the Present on Admission Workgroup where, in her role as the AHA representative to the ICD-9-CM (and later ICD-10) cooperating parties, she participated in the development and approval of present on admission (POA) guidelines and examples. She has lectured on implementation of the POA indicators for AHA audioseminars and Healthcare Financial Management Association webinars in addition to state hospitals and state health information management (HIM) associations.

Lectures

Leon-Chisen has lectured on coding, data quality, diagnosis-related groups (DRGs), and ICD-10 throughout the United States, Europe, and Latin America. She is also a speaker for the popular AHA Coding Clinic audioseminar series. She has broad health information management (HIM) experience in hospital inpatient and outpatient coding management, consulting, and teaching. She has been an instructor for the HIM and Health Information Technology (HIT) programs at the University of Illinois and Truman Community College, respectively, and both in Chicago. She is a past president of the Chicago Area Health Information Management Association and recipient of its Distinguished Member Award. She is the recipient of the Professional Achievement Award from the Illinois Health Information Management Association. She is also a member of the Advisory Board to the Health Information Technology Program, DeVry University in Chicago.

References

AHA ICD-10-CM and ICD-10-PCS Coding Handbook with Answers 2021 Edition, by Nelly Leon-Chisen. Chicago: AHA Press. .

External links
 https://commerce.ama-assn.org/store/ui/catalog/productDetail?product_id=prod3070023&sku_id=sku3090060/
 https://www.codingclinicadvisor.com/
 https://www.codingclinicadvisor.com/speakers
 https://www.aha.org/websites/2017-12-17-aha-central-office
 http://www.cms.gov/Medicare/Coding/ICD10/downloads/ICD-10OverviewPowerPoint.pdf

Biostatisticians
Living people
Year of birth missing (living people)